= William Fairley =

Scottish footballer

Personal information
- Place of birth: Scotland
- Position: Wing half

Senior career*
Years	Team	Apps	(Gls)
1890–1891	Dunmow Thistle		
1891–1892	St Mirren		
1892–1893	Grimsby Town	17	(0)
- * Club domestic league appearances and goals

William Fairley was a Scottish professional footballer who played as a wing half.
